1339 Désagneauxa, provisional designation , is a stony Eoan asteroid from the outer region of the asteroid belt, approximately 24 kilometers in diameter. It was discovered on 4 December 1934, by French astronomer Louis Boyer at the North African Algiers Observatory in Algeria. A few nights later, the asteroid was independently discovered by astronomers Grigory Neujmin and Eugène Delporte, at the Crimean Simeiz and Belgian Uccle Observatory, respectively. It was later named after discoverer's brother-in-law.

Orbit and classification 

Désagneauxa is a member of the Eos family, which is thought to have formed from a catastrophic collision, disrupting its parent body into thousands of fragments. It is the 4th largest asteroid family with nearly 10,000 known members. The asteroid orbits the Sun in the outer main-belt at a distance of 2.8–3.2 AU once every 5 years and 3 months (1,917 days). Its orbit has an eccentricity of 0.06 and an inclination of 9° with respect to the ecliptic. As no precovery were taken, and no prior identifications were made, the body's observation arc begins with its official discovery at Algiers in 1934.

Naming 

This minor planet was named by the discoverer in honour of his brother-in-law. The official naming citation was mentioned in The Names of the Minor Planets by Paul Herget in 1955.

Physical characteristics 

In the Tholen taxonomy, Désagneauxa is a stony S-type asteroid.

Rotation period 

In August 2008, a rotational lightcurve of this asteroid was obtained by French amateur astronomer René Roy. Lightcurve analysis gave it a rotation period of 9.3209 hours with a change in brightness of 0.48 magnitude. In November 2007, photometric observations at the U.S. Ricky Observatory, Missouri, gave a refined period of 9.380 hours with an amplitude of 0.45 magnitude.

Spin axis 

In addition modeled lightcurves, using photometric data from the Lowell photometric database and other sources, gave a period of 9.37510 and 9.37514 hours, as well as a spin axis of (n.a., 65.0°) and (63.0°, 53.0°) in ecliptic coordinates, respectively.

Diameter and albedo 

According to the surveys carried out by the Infrared Astronomical Satellite IRAS, the Japanese Akari satellite, and NASA's Wide-field Infrared Survey Explorer with its subsequent NEOWISE mission, Désagneauxa measures between 22.96 and 25.73 kilometers in diameter, and its surface has an albedo between 0.127 and 0.159. The Collaborative Asteroid Lightcurve Link derives an albedo of 0.1747 and a diameter of 23.04 kilometers with an absolute magnitude of 10.7.

References

External links 
 Asteroid Lightcurve Database (LCDB), query form (info )
 Dictionary of Minor Planet Names, Google books
 Asteroids and comets rotation curves, CdR – Observatoire de Genève, Raoul Behrend
 Discovery Circumstances: Numbered Minor Planets (1)-(5000) – Minor Planet Center
 
 

001339
Discoveries by Louis Boyer (astronomer)
Named minor planets
001339
19341204